Daan van Dinter (born 12 January 1989) is a Dutch former professional footballer who plays for Dutch amateur side Oisterwijk.

Club career
He formerly played for Willem II and FC Den Bosch.

He left Achilles Veen for Oisterwijk in summer 2017.

References

External links
 Voetbal International

1989 births
Living people
Footballers from Tilburg
Association football defenders
Dutch footballers
Willem II (football club) players
FC Den Bosch players
Eredivisie players
Eerste Divisie players
Achilles Veen players